Cove Gap is an unincorporated community in Peters Township in Franklin County, in the U.S. state of Pennsylvania.  The community is located along Pennsylvania Route 16 in the western portion of the township, near Buchanan's Birthplace State Park.

History
In 1878, Cove Gap had approximately 50 inhabitants. A post office called Cove Gap was established in 1923, and remained in operation until 1938.

Buchanan's Birthplace State Park is located in Cove Gap and honors the 15th President of the United States, James Buchanan, who was born near the site on April 23, 1791.

References

Unincorporated communities in Franklin County, Pennsylvania
Unincorporated communities in Pennsylvania